Simeon Peter Brown (born 8 April 1991) is a New Zealand politician and Member of Parliament in the House of Representatives for the National Party.

Political career
In his youth, Brown joined his local residents' association, the Clendon Residents Group, and became its Secretary. He then chaired the inaugural Manurewa Youth Council. In 2013 he was elected to the Auckland Council Manurewa Local Board, on which he also served as deputy chair.

Brown entered a submission to parliament in which he opposed the Marriage (Definition of Marriage) Amendment Act 2013, which allows same-sex couples to legally marry.

Brown stated, in an interview on his youth, that he was motivated to go into politics to stand up for the values of and fight for "hard work, personal responsibility and enterprise". Brown is often mocked on social media particularly with the phrase "a rare misstep for Simeon Brown."

Member of Parliament

The Pakuranga electorate has been a safe seat for National since 1987 and since then it had been held by Maurice Williamson. Brown was selected as the National Party's candidate to replace Williamson after he decided not to seek re-election. Brown was elected with a majority of 14,886 votes.

In February 2018, a private member's bill introduced by Brown was drawn from the ballot. The Bill would ensure that anyone who supplies illegal synthetic drugs receives a penalty consistent with the penalty prescribed for supplying a Class C Drug. The Bill was strongly supported by family members of synthetics victim Calum Jones but voted down by Parliament.

Brown voted against the Abortion Legislation Act 2020, which effectively seeks to remove abortion from the Crimes Act 1961. Stuff political reporter Henry Cooke described the MP as "one of the most socially conservative MPs in [the National Party]". He voted against the Bill prohibiting homosexual conversion therapy. 

During the 2020 New Zealand general election, Brown was re-elected in Pakuranga by a large margin of 10,050 votes, making Pakuranga the safest seat for National in terms of the candidate vote.

In the November 2020 caucus reshuffle, led by National's leader Judith Collins, Brown was admitted to the Shadow Cabinet, ranking 20 on the National Party's list, and is now holding four shadow portfolios in Police, Serious Fraud Office, Youth and Corrections.

In early May 2021, Brown received several death threats following his criticism of Green Party co-leader Marama Davidson visiting a hui held by the Waikato Mongrel Mob. He had claimed that her visit was an insult to victims of gang-related crime. In late May, Brown also received several threatening messages from Mongrel Mob members after he criticized a funeral procession in a tweet for allegedly taking over a road in Hawke's Bay. These  comments were passed onto the Police. Louise Hutchinson, the Public Liaison for the Waikato Mongrel Mob Kingdom, accused Brown of cultural insensitivity and of using gangs as a "politicking tool." Hutchinson also said that the Waikato Mongrel Mob Kingdom had repeatedly invited Brown and the National Party to meet with them but that these invitations had been declined.

In February 2022, Brown was one of only eight MPs to vote against the Conversion Practices Prohibition Legislation Act 2022.

In June 2022, Brown was caught in a controversy where he liked a Facebook post by fellow MP Simon O'Connor which expressed it was a "good day" following Dobbs v. Jackson Women's Health Organization's overturn of US Supreme Court case Roe v. Wade, which curtailed abortion rights in the US. Brown later apologised for liking O'Connor's post.

On 19 January 2023, Brown was allocated the new Auckland issues portfolio in Party leader Christopher Luxon's shadow cabinet.

Personal life
Before entering Parliament, Brown worked in commercial banking as a senior associate with the Bank of New Zealand. He studied at the University of Auckland, attaining a conjoint degree in law and commerce in 2015. Brown fought for the right of official affiliation at the University of Auckland for his group ProLife Auckland while he was president.

Brown is a Baptist Christian who attends church regularly. He lives in his electorate in Auckland with his wife Rebecca. Together they have two children.

References

1991 births
Living people
People from Rotorua
New Zealand National Party MPs
Members of the New Zealand House of Representatives
Unsuccessful candidates in the 2014 New Zealand general election
Candidates in the 2017 New Zealand general election
New Zealand MPs for Auckland electorates
New Zealand anti-abortion activists
New Zealand Baptists
People educated at Manurewa High School
University of Auckland alumni